The 1941 Kansai Collegiate American Football League season took place during the 1941 college football season.  This was the first year of the league's existence.

American football in Japan